John Barnes "Jack" Wells (October 17, 1880 – August 8, 1935), was an American composer and singer. He sang as a tenor. He was once described as "one of the best known concert singers in New York." He was a popular singer and was featured on many 78-rpm recordings released in the early 1900s. He starred in the 1903 musical theater production of The Wizard of Oz. One of his last performances was in Uncle Tom's Cabin (1933). He also used the pseudonym William Barnes and composed music under the name Jack Wells.

References

External links

 

1880 births
1935 deaths
People from Ashley, Pennsylvania
American tenors
20th-century American singers
20th-century American male singers